Kandagar (also known as Kandahar) is a 2010 Russian historical action film detailing the escape of a Russian crew from Afghanistan at the hands of Taliban fighters on August 16, 1996.  The film stars some of Russia's most famous actors, Vladimir Mashkov, Andrei Panin and Alexander Baluyev.  The movie is based on the Russian pilot's, Vladimir Sharpatov, diary.  The film was released in Russia on April 4, 2010.  The Andrey Kavun film is the first to depict Russians in Afghanistan after the Soviet withdrawal from the country.

Background
On August 3, 1995 a Mikoyan-Gurevich MiG-21 from the Taliban's air force forced down a Russian Ilyushin Il-76 plane with seven Russian nationals on board.  The aircraft was forced to land at a Taliban controlled airfield near Kandahar.  The men were held prisoners for more than one year by the Taliban which controlled about half of Afghanistan at the time during the Afghan Civil War.  The movie follows their captivity, day-to-day survival, and escape from Taliban.

Unexpected negligence from Russian diplomats caused the prisoners to take steps toward their freedom themselves. The captain was forced to teach Taliban fighters to fly the plane, and the rest of the hostages were allowed to visit their aircraft for maintenance.

At some point the Russian crew worked out the escape plan, and during one of the maintenance visits for landing gear work, they were able to gain control over the plane.  Despite interception efforts by Taliban base guards, which caused the aircraft to start the takeoff having only half of the runway, they were able to take off. 
Despite several technical difficulties immediately after takeoff, they finally gained a safe cruising altitude and speed.

Cast
 Aleksandr Baluev - Vladimir Ivanovich Sharpatov, pilot
 Vladimir Mashkov - Serega, co-pilot
 Andrei Panin - Alexander Gotov, navigator
 Alexandr Golubev - Vitek, boardwriter
 Bohdan Beniuk - Roman Vakulenko, flight engineer
 Aleksandr Robak - Mark

See also
 The 9th Company

References

External links
 
 Official site

2010 films
2010s Russian-language films
2010s historical action films
2010s action war films
Russian aviation films
Russian historical action films
Russian action war films
Russian war drama films
Films set in Afghanistan
Thriller films based on actual events
Films directed by Andrey Kavun
Films set in 1995
Films set in 1996